Marcus Annius Florianus (19 August 232  9 September 276), also known as Florian, was Roman emperor from the death of his half-brother, Emperor Tacitus, in July 276 until his own murder in September of that year.

Florianus was the maternal half-brother of Tacitus, who was proclaimed emperor in late 275 after the unexpected death of Emperor Aurelian. After Tacitus died the following year, allegedly assassinated as a consequence of a military plot, Florianus proclaimed himself emperor, with the recognition of the Roman Senate and much of the empire. However, the new emperor soon had to deal with the revolt of Probus, who rose up shortly after Florianus ascended the throne, with the backing of the provinces of Egypt, Syria, Palestine, and Phoenicia. Probus took advantage of the terrain of the Cilician Gates, and the hot climate of the area, to which Florianus' army was unaccustomed, to chip away at their morale. Florianus' army rose up against him and killed him.

History

In late 275, Florianus' maternal half-brother, Tacitus, was proclaimed Roman Emperor after the unexpected death of Emperor Aurelian. Soon after, Tacitus appointed Florianus as praetorian prefect. Tacitus then ordered Florianus to lead troops to Pannonia, in order to repel raids into Roman territory by the Goths. After Tacitus died suddenly in July 276, allegedly as a consequence of a military plot, Florianus swiftly proclaimed himself emperor, and was recognized as such by the Roman Senate and the western provinces. Florianus then continued to campaign against the Goths, winning a major victory before the news reached him of the revolt of Probus, who had served successfully as a commander under both Aurelian and Tacitus. Probus' revolt was supported by the provinces of Egypt, Syria, Palestine, and Phoenicia.

Probus took advantage of his control of Egyptian grain, which he used to swiftly cut off the supply of grain to the rest of the empire. He led his troops to Asia Minor, in order to defend the Cilician Gates, allowing him to utilize guerrilla tactics to wage a war of attrition rather than a straightforward confrontation. Florianus led his troops to Cilicia, and billeted his forces in Tarsus. However, many of his troops, who were unaccustomed to the hot climate of the area, fell ill due to a summer heat wave. Upon learning of this, Probus launched raids around the city, in order to weaken the morale of Florianus' forces. This strategy was successful, and Florianus lost control of his army, which in September rose up against him and killed him. Florianus' reign lasted less than three months, 88 days according to the Chronograph of 354 and 80 days according to Eutropius.

See also
 List of Roman emperors

References

Citations

Bibliography

External links

232 births
276 deaths
3rd-century Roman emperors
3rd-century murdered monarchs
Crisis of the Third Century
Florianus, Marcus
Murdered Roman emperors
Praetorian prefects
Year of birth unknown